Don Teodósio, Prince of Brazil, Duke of Braganza (Teodósio de Bragança; ; 8 February 1634 – 15 May 1653) was the heir apparent son of John IV of Portugal (first king of the House of Braganza) and his wife Luisa de Guzmán. In 1645, he was given the title of Prince of Brazil, a new crown princely position thus created. Also, his father granted him the duchy as 10th Duke of Braganza, presumably after his uncle Duarte died in 1649.

Biography

He was born on 8 February 1634 in Vila Viçosa and was the heir to the throne of Portugal from 1641 until his death at only 19 years of age.

When the prince was 13 years old, he took part in the State Council's reunions.

Teodósio's death, on 15 May 1653, due to tuberculosis, caused great unrest in the kingdom. His next brother, the medically and mentally problem-ridden Afonso, succeeded him as Prince of Brazil, Duke of Braganza and heir apparent of the kingdom. Due to mental incapacity and impotence, Afonso would eventually be deposed by Peter II and died childless.

Interests
Teodósio was a gifted young man. He knew Greek and Latin, was keen on philosophy and well respected amongst the great intellectuals of the time.

He had a great interest in astrology. He had a collection of charts of his family and made predictions on several political subjects. His astrological interests were encouraged and aided by his tutor, the Jesuit priest António Vieira.
Under the tutelage of astrologers of the day, he composed many astrological charts.

See also
Prince of Brazil
Afonso VI of Portugal
Pedro II of Portugal

Ancestry

References

External links

 Dom Theodosio the Astrologer Prince
 Genealogy of Prince Teodósio

House of Braganza
1634 births
People from Vila Viçosa
1653 deaths
Teodosio 3
Princes of Brazil
Portuguese Baroque composers
Portuguese infantes
Princes of Portugal
17th-century Portuguese people
17th-century astrologers
Burials at the Monastery of São Vicente de Fora
Heirs apparent who never acceded
17th-century classical composers
Portuguese male classical composers
17th-century deaths from tuberculosis
Tuberculosis deaths in Portugal
Sons of kings